Jairo Ratial (جیرورتیال) is a village situated on the outskirts of Gujar Khan of Rawalpindi District, Punjab. Jairo Ratial is the chief village of the Union Council Jairo Ratial which is an administrative subdivision of the Tehsil. It is also within the Pothwari cultural region. It is one of the largest villages under Gujar Khan Tehsil and is also one of the important union councils of Gujar Khan (Jairo Ratial became a Union Council in 2015). It is approximately 62 km southeast to the capital territory of Pakistan, Islamabad, and 215 km to the north west of Lahore, capital of Punjab. On the northern side, Jairo Ratial is bounded by Dudian, Gulyana, and Gujar Khan city. On the Western side, Cheena, Sasral, Daultala, Chakwal are situated. On the Eastern side, Mayhall, Missa Kaswal, Mirpur Azad Kashmir are present and lastly, on the Western side, Daryala Khaki, Khengar Mamdal, Muhri Rajgan, and Domeli are situated. The town has a population of about 15,000. Jairo Ratial lies at the bank of a small river (Kass). This river makes the northern lands of the village arable and fertile (The living area of the people is quite away from the Kass).

History
Jairo Ratial was founded by Raja Jairo Khan who belonged to the Ratial clan and has a longstanding history of over 800 years. It has always been a predominantly Muslim area, even prior to the Pakistan-India partition in 1947.

Ratial is one of the tribes of the Rajput clan. The village was named after Raja Jairo Khan which is now known today as Jairo Ratial. Raja Jairo Khan had another brother known as Raja Bhairo Khan whom after which the village Bhair Ratial was founded after.

Notable people

 Raja Pervaiz Ashraf - a Pakistani businessman, farmer and politician who served as the 19th Prime Minister of Pakistan from 22 June 2012 until completing his designated term on 16 March 2013. He is a member of the National Assembly of Pakistan from NA-58 (Rawalpindi-II). He currently resides in Sanghar House, Gujar Khan.
 Muhammad Javed Ikhlas - born 5 October 1955 is a Pakistani politician who had been a member of the National Assembly of Pakistan, from June 2013 to May 2018. Previously, he had been a member of the Provincial Assembly of Punjab from 1985 to 1999

Occupation
80% of the population depends on agriculture. Lands of the area are very fertile and arable. Main Crops are: Wheat, Millet, Peanuts and other Pulses.

Languages
Pathwari(پوٹھوهاری (Shahmukhi); also known as Potohari پوٹھواری) is the main language of Jairo Ratial. Urdu is also becoming a popular language as people try to speak with their school going children.

Tribes and clans
Ratial Rajput (Minhas, Bangial), Hashmi Qureshi , Bhatti Rajput. Matiyal Jutt

Transport
There is a local private public transport service (Wagon) which runs from the village to the city of Gujar Khan. Some people use Rikshaw as a local public transport. Taxi service (Suzuki Carry) is also available.

Mosque
There are four Mosques in the village, two of them are the grand mosques (جامع مساجد).

Education
 Govt Primary School for boys Jairo Ratial
 Govt High School for boys Jairo Ratial
 Govt Middle School for girls Jairo Ratial

Shrine
Jairo Ratial also holds the shrine of Hazrat Mian Muhammad Saee Sahib, where every year people come to celebrate a 'mela' (a gathering) in his remembrance. The current successor of Hazrat Mian Muhammad Saee Sahib is Mian Muhammad Zafaryab Ahmad Sahib.

Health care
There is no Hospital in the village so people have to go to the nearby city of Gujar Khan for the health issues. The only medical facility immediately available for the villagers is first aid.

Sports
Games which boys often play are Cricket and Football. Girls play indoor games only.

References

External links

JAIRO RATIAL IN SUMMER
JAIRO RATIAL ON INOVMAPPING.COM

Rawalpindi District
Gujar Khan